The Amateur Gentleman is a novel by Jeffery Farnol, published in 1913. It was made into a silent film in 1920 and again in 1926 and a talking film in 1936 with Douglas Fairbanks, Jr. starring as the protagonist, Barnabas Barty.

Plot summary
The format of the novel is essentially that of a bildungsroman. It tells the story of Barnabas Barty, the son of John Barty, the former boxing champion of England and landlord of a pub in Kent. At the start of the tale, Barnabas comes fortuitously into the possession of a vast fortune – £700,000, an astronomical amount by Regency standards – and determines to use this fortune to become a gentleman. His father objects to this plan and they quarrel. They settle their differences in a round of fisticuffs, which Barnabas wins, beating his father fair and square. Barnabas sets off for London to further his ambitions and, on the way there, contrives to make a number of influential friends and enemies.

Farnol exploits the naïvety of the youth for comic effect. For instance, Barnabas is gulled by the chapman who sells him a book on etiquette at an outrageous mark-up. At the other end of the spectrum, Farnol is equally disdainful of Barnabas' sophisticated concealment of his identity.

Bibliography
 The Amateur Gentleman: a Romance
 Author: Jeffery Farnol
 Editor: Low, Marston, 1913
 599 pages

References

External links
 The Amateur Gentleman website dedicated to Sidney Olcott

1913 British novels
British historical novels
Novels set in Kent
Novels by Jeffery Farnol
British novels adapted into films